Spirit animal may refer to:

Spirituality
Power animal, a New Age, neoshamanic belief of a spirit that helps an individual
Spirit guide, a spiritual entity that acts as a guide or protector to a human being
Totem, in North American Indigenous cultures, a spirit or animal revered as sacred, that guides, helps, or protects individuals, lineages, and nations

Music
Spirit Animal (band), an American rock band
Spirit Animal (album) or the title song, by Zombi, 2009
"Spirit Animal" (song), by Kerli, 2016

Books
Spirit Animals (book series) published by Scholastic, 2013

See also
Familiar, in European folklore, supernatural animal guides that assist witches